Rangpur Town Hall is a City hall situated at the heart of the city of Rangpur, Bangladesh. Established in 1896 by the historical Rongopur Natya Samaj (Rangpur Dramatic Association or RDA) it is one of the oldest of its kind in Bangladesh. It has a glorious history in the whole timeline of civic society in Rangpur. It is one of the best known landmarks of the city as well.

History 
The plan to establish a theatre in Rangpur was first propagated by the RDA in 1885. Later on, in 1891 a piece of land was donated at the heart of the city by the then landlord of Kakina and the official initiatives were taken instantly. In 1896, the piece of land was handed over to the RDA by the Secretary of State for India. The first play organized here was the play "Sharmishtha(1859)" by Michael Madhusudan Dutt. But according to another source, the first play organized here was the "Kulinkulsworboswo"(1854) by Ramnarayan Tarkaratna. This town hall campus also has one of the oldest libraries in the entire Indian subcontinent, the Rangpur Public Library (estb. 1854). This campus also was home to the first ever branch of "Bangiya Sahitya Parishad" outside of Kolkata, the then capital of British India named ''Rangpur Shahitya Parishad''. This campus also has one of the earliest and unique "Shaheed Minars" in Bangladesh commemorating the sacrifices of people martyred during the Language Movement on the streets of Rangpur in 1952. This town hall was used as a "concentration camp" and torture cell for by the Pakistan Army against the resisting Bengali freedom fighters and innocent mass of Rangpur in 1971. Now the whole campus contains two of the Rangpur's premium libraries- the Public Library and the District Library, the Shahid Minar and the regional "Shilpakala Academy" (Arts Academy) of Rangpur. The current building was built in 1913.

Cultural impact 
Rangpur is called the city of joy (Rang means joy, Pur means City). Historically, Rangpur is one of the oldest cities of Bengal. The traditional inclination towards cultural prosperity helped Rangpur, to grow at its own fashoion and in it, this campus played a pivotal role. Now it is the hub of Rangpur's cultural activities. In every national day or cultural days like Pahela Baishakh, cultural programmes are organized at a huge level by both government and non-government organizations. In these days, the whole campus becomes hub of city's celebration. This is also one of the reservoirs of regional Rangpuri language and culture and the regional Bhawaiya music of North Bengal. Here, almost in every week there is at least one cultural programme or discussion is found organized by different cultural groups of the city. This institution is associated with some of the prominent figures of Bengali culture including Asaduzzaman Noor, Tulsi Lahiri and Baby Naznin. Also it hosted Sarat Chandra Chattopadhyay, Dr. Muhammad Shahidullah, and Netaji Subhas Chandra Bose previously.

References

Rangpur, Bangladesh
Buildings and structures in Rangpur Division
Historic sites in Bangladesh
Town Hall